Ruby Hembrom is the founder and director of Adivaani Organisations from West Bengal.

Biography 
Hembrom is the founder and Director of Adivaani organisation. Adivaani is the "voice of Santal peoples".  Hembrom was born in Kolkata.

References 

Living people
People from West Bengal
Year of birth missing (living people)
Indian writers